Ziwa is an Aramaic term that is typically translated as 'radiance' or 'splendor.' It is frequently used as an epithet for celestial beings and manifestations of God in Gnostic religions such as Mandaeism and Manichaeism.

The Hebrew cognate is ziv.

Scripts
Ziwa written in different scripts:

Hebrew script: 
Mandaic script: 
Syriac script: 
Arabic script:

Mandaeism

In Mandaeism, uthras (celestial beings) often have the Mandaic term Ziwa / Ziua (meaning 'Radiance'; Neo-Mandaic pronunciation ) attached after their names, due to their origins from the World of Light.

Pairs of uthras also typically have rhyming names. The names can be alliterative (e.g., Adathan and Yadathan), or one name may have an infixed consonant or syllable (e.g., Kapan and Kanpan).

Uthras commonly referred to as "Ziwa" include:
Hibil Ziwa
Sam Ziwa (or Sam Smira Ziwa)
Yawar Ziwa
Qmamir Ziwa (an epithet of Saureil)

Other uthras that are also referred to as "Ziwa" include:
Bhaq Ziwa (an epithet of Abatur)
Etinṣib Ziwa
Ham Ziwa and Nhur Ziwa
Nbaṭ Ziwa
Nṣab Ziwa
Piriawis Ziwa
Fraš Ziwa
Zarzeil Ziwa
Hamgai Ziwa, son of Hamgagai Ziwa
Karkawan Ziwa
S'haq Ziwa
Šar Ziwa

Adam kasia (the "hidden Adam") is also referred to as Adakas Ziwa in the Ginza Rabba.

Manichaeism

In Manichaeism, the Syriac term Ziwa is also used to refer to Jesus as Isho Ziwā (Jesus the Splendor), who is sent to awaken Adam and Eve to the source of the spiritual light trapped within their physical bodies.

Ṣfat Ziwā, or The Keeper of the Splendor, who holds up the ten heavens from above, is one of the five sons of The Living Spirit ( ruḥā ḥayyā) in the second creation.

In Manichaeism, pairs of celestial beings can also have rhyming names, such as Xroshtag and Padvaxtag.

See also
World of Light
Nūr (Islam)
Ohr in Jewish mysticism
Divine light

References

Light and religion
Aramaic words and phrases
Mandaic words and phrases

Manichaeism
Epithets